The discography of the Smashing Pumpkins, an American alternative rock band formed in Chicago, Illinois, consists of twelve studio albums, four live albums, one digital live album series, seven compilation albums (including box sets and promotional releases), five extended plays (including promotional releases), 55 singles (including promotional releases), four video albums, 37 music videos, and contributions to five soundtrack albums. This list does not include material recorded by The Smashing Pumpkins members with other side projects.

As of 2012, The Smashing Pumpkins have sold 16.7 million albums according to Nielsen Soundscan.

Albums

Studio albums 

 II Machina II had a free internet release and thus did not chart and was not eligible for certification.

Live albums

Compilation albums

EPs 
For the live extended plays Live in Chicago October 23, 1995 and Bonus EP, see the live albums section of this article.

 I The song "Rhinoceros" charted from this release.
 II The song "Zero" charted from this release.
 III Promotional bonus disc issued with limited-edition printings of Machina/The Machines of God.
 IV Songs from Songs for a Sailor were sporadically released one at a time to be downloaded starting from December 8, 2009.

Box sets

Singles

Promotional singles 

 V  "Daughter" was released as a 7-inch one-sided flexi disc in subscriber copies of the April 4, 1992 issue of Reflex magazine.
 VII  "Daphne Descends" was released as a promotional CD single exclusively in France.
 VIII  B-side of "Perfect" written by James Iha, released as a promotional cassette single.
 X  "Heavy Metal Machine" was issued as a promotional cassette single prior to the release of Machina.
 XI  "Simmatar/Magdalana", "Saffron/Zope", "Huzzah!/Automaton", "MaryQ/Burr" and "Excelsior/Necromance" are to be released as part of the Atum Vinyl Boxset Limited Edition as five bonus 7" singles.

Other charted songs

Demo albums

Video albums 

 I This video was a limited edition release packaged with Siamese Dream that contains the videos for "Siva", "Rhinoceros", "Cherub Rock", "Today", and "Disarm".

Music videos 

 
This music video was unreleased prior to its inclusion on 2001's Greatest Hits DVD.
IIThis music video contains footage from Batman & Robin directed by Joel Schumacher.

An internet-only "interactive music video" was released for "The Crying Tree of Mercury" by MTV in March 2000, directed by Billy Corgan. It is no longer available through MTV's website.

Other appearances 

 I Ozark Mountain Daredevils cover

 II Johnny Marks cover

 III Vic Chestnutt cover

 IV Depeche Mode cover

See also 
 List of artists who reached number one on the U.S. alternative rock chart

Notes

References 

 The Aeroplane Flies High [box set liner notes]. Beverly Hills: Virgin Records America. 1996
 Strong, Martin C.: The Great Rock Discography, 6th edn., 2002, Canongate,

References

External links 
 
 

Discography
Alternative rock discographies
Discographies of American artists